Radio Žepče is a Bosnian local public radio station, broadcasting from Žepče, Bosnia and Herzegovina. The radio station is available in municipalities of Zenica-Doboj Canton.It was launched on 10 October 2007 by the municipal council of Žepče.

This radio station broadcasts a variety of programs such as music, talk shows and local news. Program is mainly produced in Croatian. Estimated number of potential listeners of Radio Žepče is around 146.413

Frequencies
The program is currently broadcast at 2 frequencies:
 Žepče 
 Žepče

See also 
 List of radio stations in Bosnia and Herzegovina
 Radio Zenica 
 Radio Doboj

References

External links 
 Communications Regulatory Agency of Bosnia and Herzegovina

Žepče
Radio stations established in 2007
Žepče